The Unicorns: 2014  is an EP by the Unicorns released in 2004 by Suicide Squeeze Records. It was the band's final release prior to their split in late 2004. The 7" version was pressed on purple vinyl and limited to 2,000 copies.

Track listing
All songs written and composed by the Unicorns.

7"

CD

References

The Unicorns albums
2004 EPs
Suicide Squeeze Records albums